The Portuguese Roman Catholic Diocese of Aveiro has existed since 1938. In that year it was formed as territories taken from the historical diocese of Coimbra, diocese of Porto and diocese of Viseu were combined. It is a suffragan of the archdiocese of Braga. In 2012, it had 274,400 baptized over 314,800 inhabitants.

Its see at Aveiro is also the capital of the district of Aveiro. The bishop is António Francisco dos Santos, appointed in 2006.

List of Bishops of Aveiro 
 António Freire Gameiro de Sousa (1774–1799)
 António José Cordeiro (1801–1813)
 Manuel Pacheco de Resende (1815–1837)
 António de Santo Ilídio da Fonseca e Silva (1840
 António Mendes Bello (1881), Diocesan administrator
 João Evangelista de Lima Vidal (1940–1958)
 Domingos da Apresentação Fernandes (1958–1962)
 Manuel de Almeida Trindade (1962–1988)
 António Baltasar Marcelino (January 20, 1988 – September 21, 2006)
 António Francisco dos Santos (September 21, 2006 – February 21, 2014)
 António Manuel Moiterio Ramos (July 4, 2014- )

Territory
The territory covers 1,537 km² and is divided into 101 parishes, grouped into 10 archipresbiterati, corresponding to the 10 municipalities of the district.

Notes

Aveiro
Aveiro, Roman Catholic Diocese of